Charles F. Royal (1880–1955) was an American screenwriter active primarily in the 1930 and 1940s. He worked on a number of western films for studios such as Columbia and Republic Pictures.

Selected filmography

 The Hawk (1931)
 The Courageous Avenger (1935)
 The New Adventures of Tarzan (1935)
 Shadows of the Orient (1935)
 Between Men (1935)
 The Fire Trap (1935)
 Western Courage (1935)
 Valley of the Lawless (1936)
 Tundra (1936)
 Outlaws of the Orient (1937)
 Lightnin' Crandall (1937)
 Guns in the Dark (1937)
 Ridin' the Lone Trail (1937)
 The Colorado Kid (1937)
 The Old Barn Dance (1938)
 Rio Grande (1938)
 The Colorado Trail (1938)
 Gangs of New York (1938)
 Trouble in Sundown (1939)
 Outpost of the Mounties (1939)
 Texas Stampede (1939)
 The Taming of the West (1939)
 The Man from Tumbleweeds (1940)
 Lone Star Raiders (1940)
 North from the Lone Star (1941)
 A Tornado in the Saddle (1942)
 Dark Mountain (1944)
 Arctic Fury (1949)

References

Bibliography
 Pitts, Michael R. Poverty Row Studios, 1929–1940: An Illustrated History of 55 Independent Film Companies, with a Filmography for Each. McFarland & Company, 2005.

External links

1880 births
1955 deaths
American screenwriters
People from Oregon